Danielle Laney is a former Olympic Level Competitor in Taekwondo.  Danielle is from Jenks, Oklahoma  She competed in the women's welterweight division. She would win the Olympic trials by going undefeated, beating Arlene Limas. At the 1992 Olympics she would win a bronze.  Her brother Brian Laney was also a member of the National Team.

See also
 USA Taekwondo

References

Year of birth missing (living people)
Living people
American female taekwondo practitioners
Olympic bronze medalists for the United States in taekwondo
Medalists at the 1992 Summer Olympics
20th-century American women